Paranisolambda is an extinct genus of proterotheriid litopterns from the Early to Middle Eocene of Brazil. Fossils of Paranisolambda have been recovered from the Itaboraí Formation in the Brazilian state of Rio de Janeiro.

Etymology 
The genus name, Paranisolambda, is derived from the Greek para/παρα meaning "beside" or "near", and its close relative Anisolambda, the genus it was originally assigned to. The specific name, "prodromus"  is derived from the Greek word prodromos, meaning "forerunner".

History 
The first remains of Paranisolambda were found in the Sāo José De Itaboraí Basin in 1948, consisting of the right mandible of a young individual as the holotype.

Taxonomy

References 

Proterotheriids
Eocene mammals of South America
Casamayoran
Itaboraian
Riochican
Paleogene Brazil
Fossils of Brazil
Fossil taxa described in 1983
Prehistoric placental genera